The Siena–Albany rivalry, also known as the Albany Cup, is a College basketball rivalry between the Siena Saints and the Albany Great Danes.

Until the 2016 game, which was played at UAlbany's SEFCU Arena, all games between the two rival schools had been contested at the MVP Arena (formerly the Times Union Center until 2021), which is normally Siena's home arena. This caused a brief war of words between the coaches of both teams (Jimmy Patsos of Siena and Will Brown of Albany) in the run-up to that contest.

All-time results (since 2001) 

Source: UAlbany 2016—17 Media Guide

References

College basketball rivalries in the United States
Albany Great Danes men's basketball
Siena Saints men's basketball
1940 establishments in New York (state)